The 2021 Belarusian Super Cup was held on 2 March 2021 between the 2020 Belarusian Premier League champions Shakhtyor Soligorsk and the 2019–20 Belarusian Cup winners BATE Borisov. Shakhtyor Soligorsk won the match 5–4 on penalties and won the trophy for the first time.

Match details

See also
2020 Belarusian Premier League
2019–20 Belarusian Cup

References

Belarusian Super Cup
Super
Belarusian Super Cup
Sports competitions in Minsk
2020s in Minsk
Belarusian Super Cup 2021
FC Shakhtyor Soligorsk matches
Belarusian Super Cup 2021